Spruce Creek is a very minor tributary of the Upper Mississippi River confined mainly to Tete des Mortes Township in southeastern Dubuque County, Iowa and Bellevue Township in northeastern Jackson County, Iowa, entering the Mississippi a few miles above Bellevue.

Jackson County has a park there.

See also
List of rivers of Iowa

References

Tributaries of the Mississippi River
Rivers of Dubuque County, Iowa
Bodies of water of Jackson County, Iowa
Rivers of Iowa